John Raymond David Griff (April 22, 1940 – March 9, 2016) was a Canadian country music singer and songwriter, born in Vancouver and raised in Toronto. His songwriting credits reached over 2500 songs, many of which were recorded by Nashville's top recording artists.

Early life and career
Griff was born in Vancouver, British Columbia, Canada  and raised in Winfield, Alberta. He began songwriting in the early 1960s and had early cuts by Johnny Horton, Jim Reeves, and others. Griff moved to Nashville, Tennessee in 1964 to pursue his music career full-time. His first records as a singer were released in the late 1960s and Griff had his first hit, "Patches", a remake of the Clarence Carter soul hit in 1970 which peaked at No. 26 in Billboard. Griff recorded for the small country label Royal American and later moved on to Dot Records without much success. His stint at Capitol Records from 1975-1979 proved more successful, racking up eight more country top 40 hits, the most successful being 1976's "If I Let Her Come In" which peaked at No. 11.

Griff's success as a songwriter, however, always overshadowed his recording work with over 700 songs recorded, including the major hits "Canadian Pacific" for George Hamilton IV, "Who's Gonna Play This Old Piano" for Jerry Lee Lewis, and "Baby" for Wilma Burgess. Others who had major hit records with Griff songs include Faron Young, Porter Wagoner & Dolly Parton, Bob Luman, Gene Watson, and Johnny Duncan.

Griff returned to Canada in the late 1970s and remained active on the country music scene there as an artist, songwriter, and record producer. He lived a quiet life in Calgary, Alberta, occasionally performing at country venues with musicians from the area, most notably the Ranchman's Inn.

Later years
In 2008, Griff was awarded the Lifetime Achievement Award by SOCAN at the annual SOCAN Awards in Toronto.

Griff had battled throat cancer in his recent years, and he died on March 9, 2016, from pneumonia following surgery. He was 75.

Discography

Albums

Singles

A"Weeping Willow Tree" also peaked at number 39 on the Canadian RPM Top 40 chart.

References

External links
Ray Griff website

1940 births
2016 deaths
Canadian male singer-songwriters
Canadian country singer-songwriters
Groove Records artists
Musicians from Vancouver
Musicians from Nashville, Tennessee